Morab, India is a village in Dharwad district of Karnataka, India. It is the biggest village in Navalgund taluk. Village is well connected to Hubli, Dharwad and Navalgund.

References

Villages in Dharwad district